Cryptoparachtes is a genus of Asian woodlouse hunter spiders that was first described by P. M. Dunin in 1992.  it contains only three species: C. adzharicus, C. charitonowi, and C. fedotovi.

References

External links

Araneomorphae genera
Dysderidae
Fauna of Azerbaijan
Fauna of Georgia (country)